Euchloridae is a family of sponges belonging to the order Cydippida.

Genera:
 Euchlora Chun, 1880

References

Sponges